Hembrey is a surname. Notable people with the surname include:

Randy Hembrey (born 1965), American auto racing executive
Shea Hembrey (born 1974), American artist

See also
Hembree